Tiger Global Management, LLC (often referred to as Tiger Global and formerly known as Tiger Technology) is an American investment firm. It mainly focuses on Internet, software, consumer, and financial technology industries.

Background and history 
Chase Coleman III was a protégé of Julian Robertson and from 1997 to 2000 worked as a technology analyst for the firm, Tiger Management. In 2000, Robertson closed Tiger Management, and entrusted Coleman with over $25 million to manage, making him one of the 30 or more so-called "Tiger Cubs", fund managers who started their fund management careers with Tiger Management.

In 2001, Coleman established Tiger Technology (which would be later renamed to Tiger Global Management, LLC), as a hedge fund to invest in the public equity market. In 2003, Scott Shleifer helped Tiger Global expand into investing in the private equity market.

From the period of 2007 to 2017, according to the Preqin Venture Report, Tiger Global raised the highest amount of capital amongst venture capital firms.

In 2020, Tiger Global earned its investors $10.4 billion, more than any other hedge fund on the annual list of the top 20 managers compiled by London fund-of-funds firm LCH Investments.

In March 2022, Tiger Global raised $12.7 billion for a new fund to back fast-growing technology companies in their early stages; the firm has reported 900 investors involved in the new fund.

2022 losses
In 2022, the firm experienced significant losses. By June 2022, the firm's hedge fund and its long-only fund had respectively declined 52% and 62% in value since the beginning of the year. The Wall Street Journal and Financial Times reported that these losses eliminated some two-thirds of the value accrued by the hedge fund and the long-only fund over the duration of their existences, while New York cited research indicating the losses could account for three-fourths of lifetime gains. The Wall Street Journal has referred to the hedge fund's loss as "one of the largest-ever", and an anonymous hedge fund manager quoted by New York referred to the losses as "[...] the biggest in the history of hedge funds".

In June, the firm's venture capital losses were reported to be less severe than those of the firm's funds. A letter to investors from Tiger summarizing the performance of its venture funds in the first quarter of 2022 revealed that losses associated with the funds stood at around 9%.

Business overview 

Tiger Global has two strategies that each manage roughly the same amount of capital.

The public equity business uses equity strategies to invest in publicly traded companies. Its notable funds include Tiger Global Investments (the firm’s flagship long-short fund) and Tiger Global Long Opportunities (long-only).

The private equity strategy, which is led by Scott Shleifer, targets growth-oriented private companies from early to late stages, with an emphasis on businesses based in the U.S., China and India. Tiger Global is estimated to invest around 30% of its capital in early stage (Series A and B) startups, and 20.5% directed toward Series C startups. The head of the Private Equity business was Lee Fixel until March 2019.

Tiger Global is based in New York with affiliate offices in Hong Kong, Beijing, Singapore and Bangalore.

Private equity funds

Notable venture capital investments 

 Alibaba
 ByteDance
 Carta
 Coinbase
 Credit Karma
 Databricks
 DST Global
 Facebook
 Flipkart
 Glassdoor
 JD.com
 Kajabi
 Koo
 LinkedIn
 Nextdoor
 Nubank
 Quora
 SenseTime
 Softbank Group
 Spotify
 Block
 Stripe
 strongDM
 The Viral Fever
 UiPath
 Waymo
 Yandex

References

External links
 www.tigerglobal.com (Company Website)

Tiger Management
American companies established in 2001
Financial services companies established in 2001
Financial services companies based in New York City
Hedge funds
Hedge fund firms in New York City
Investment companies based in New York City
Private equity firms of the United States
Venture capital firms of the United States